The Stroud and District Combination Senior Cup is an annual rugby union knock-out club competition organized by the Stroud and District Combination - one of the five bodies that make up the Gloucestershire Rugby Football Union.  It was first introduced during the 1974-75 season, with the inaugural winners being the Royal Agricultural College and is the most important rugby union competition in Stroud District, ahead of the Junior Cup and Bill Adams Cup.  With only 9 member clubs the combination is one of the smallest in Gloucestershire. 

The Senior Cup is currently open to club sides based in Stroud District which can range between tier 7 (Tribute Western Counties North) all the way down to tier 11 (Gloucester 3).  
The format is a knockout cup with semi-finals followed by a final to be held at a neutral ground in the region between March-May.

Stroud and District Combination Senior Cup winners

Number of wins
Cirencester (19)
Painswick (11)
Dursley (6)
Stroud (3)
Royal Agricultural College (2)
Stroud II (1)
Stroud III (1)
Tetbury (1)

Notes

See also
 Gloucestershire RFU
 Stroud & District Combination Junior Cup
 Stroud & District Combination Bill Adams Cup
 English rugby union system
 Rugby union in England

References

External links
 Gloucestershire RFU

Recurring sporting events established in 1974
1974 establishments in England
Rugby union cup competitions in England
Rugby union in Gloucestershire